Jean-Marc Fabre (born 7 June 1964) is a French cinematographer. He has contributed to more than fifty films since 1988 including Lemming and Nathalie....

Filmography
 2001 : How I Killed My Father 2009 : Change of Plans 2012 : Camille Rewinds 2015 : Valentin Valentin 2017 : Garde alternée''

References

External links
 

1964 births
Living people
French cinematographers
Place of birth missing (living people)